Artiodactyla is an order of placental mammals composed of even-toed ungulates—hooved animals which bear weight equally on two of their five toes with the other toes either present, absent, vestigial, or pointing posteriorly—as well as their descendants, the aquatic cetaceans. Members of this order are called artiodactyls. The order is sometimes named Cetartiodactyla, in reference to the inclusion of cetaceans in the order beginning in the 1990s. Artiodactyla currently comprises 349 extant species, which are grouped into 131 genera. Artiodactyls live on every major landmass and throughout the oceans and in a variety of habitats, including forests, grasslands, and deserts. Some artiodactyls, such as cattle, goats, sheep, pigs, water buffalo, camels, llamas, yaks, and gayals, have been domesticated, resulting in a worldwide distribution and population sizes for some animals of over one billion.

Artiodactyla is divided into four suborders: Ruminantia, Suina, Tylopoda, and Whippomorpha. The suborders are further subdivided into clades and families. Ruminantia contains six families, Antilocapridae, Bovidae, Cervidae, Giraffidae, Moschidae, and Tragulidae, and includes ruminant animals such as cattle, antelope, deer, and sheep. Suina contains two, Suidae and Tayassuidae, and includes pigs and peccaries; Tylopoda comprises only Camelidae, the camels and llamas; and Whippomorpha contains fourteen, Balaenidae, Balaenopteridae, Cetotheriidae, Delphinidae, Iniidae, Kogiidae, Lipotidae, Monodontidae, Phocoenidae, Physeteridae, Platanistidae, Pontoporiidae, Ziphiidae, and Hippopotamidae, and includes the aquatic whales and dolphins as well as hippopotamuses. The exact organization of the species is not fixed, with many recent proposals made based on molecular phylogenetic analysis. Three species have gone extinct since 1500 CE: the aurochs and the bluebuck in Bovidae and Schomburgk's deer in Cervidae. Additionally, the red gazelle in Bovidae is considered either extinct or to have never existed; the kouprey in Bovidae is potentially extinct, with no sightings since 1969; and so is the baiji in Lipotidae, last seen in 2002. Several other species are extinct in the wild or critically endangered.

Conventions
Range maps are provided wherever possible; if a range map is not available, a description of the collective range of species in that genera is provided. Ranges are based on the International Union for Conservation of Nature (IUCN) Red List of Threatened Species unless otherwise noted. All extinct genera or species listed alongside extant species went extinct after 1500 CE, and are indicated by a dagger symbol "".

Classification
The order Artiodactyla consists of 348 extant species belonging to 131 genera. This does not include hybrid species or extinct prehistoric species. Modern molecular studies indicate that the 131 genera can be grouped into 23 families; these families are grouped into named suborders and many are further grouped into named clades, and some of these families are subdivided into named subfamilies.

Suborder Ruminantia
 Infraorder Pecora
 Family Antilocapridae (pronghorn): 1 genus, 1 species
 Family Bovidae
 Subfamily Aepycerotinae (impala): 1 genus, 1 species
 Subfamily Alcelaphinae (wildebeest, hartebeest, bonteboks): 4 genera, 6 species
 Subfamily Antilopinae (antelope, gazelles): 15 genera, 39 species
 Subfamily Bovinae (cattle, buffalos, bison): 9 genera, 30 species (1 extinct)
 Subfamily Caprinae (goats, sheep, ibex, serows): 14 genera, 35 species
 Subfamily Cephalophinae (duikers): 3 genera, 20 species
 Subfamily Hippotraginae (addax, oryx): 3 genera, 8 species (1 extinct)
 Subfamily Reduncinae (reedbuck and kob antelope): 3 genera, 9 species
 Family Cervidae (deer)
 Subfamily Capreolinae (New World deer): 10 genera, 23 species
 Subfamily Cervinae (Old World deer): 9 genera, 32 species (1 extinct)
 Family Giraffidae (okapi and giraffes): 2 genera, 5 species
 Family Moschidae (musk deer): 1 genus, 7 species
 Infraorder Tragulina
 Family Tragulidae (chevrotains): 3 genera, 10 species

Suborder Suina
 Family Suidae (pigs): 6 genera, 17 species
 Family Tayassuidae (peccaries): 3 genera, 3 species

Suborder Tylopoda
 Family Camelidae (camels and llamas): 2 genera, 7 species

Suborder Whippomorpha
 Infraorder Cetacea
 Parvorder Mysticeti (baleen whales)
 Family Balaenidae (right whales): 2 genera, 4 species
 Family Balaenopteridae (rorquals): 3 genera, 11 species
 Family Cetotheriidae (pygmy right whale): 1 genus, 1 species
 Parvorder Odontoceti (toothed whales)
 Family Delphinidae (oceanic dolphins)
 Subfamily Delphininae (dolphins): 6 genera, 15 species
 Subfamily Lissodelphininae (smooth dolphins): 2 genera, 6 species
 Subfamily Globicephalinae (round-headed whales)
 Subfamily Orcininae (killer whale): 7 genera, 9 species
 Subfamily incertae sedis (white-beaked dolphin and Atlantic white-sided dolphin): 1 genera, 6 species
 Family Iniidae (Amazonian river dolphins): 1 genus, 4 species
 Family Kogiidae (dwarf and pygmy sperm whales): 1 genus, 2 species
 Family Lipotidae (Chinese river dolphins): 1 genus, 1 species
 Family Monodontidae (narwhal and beluga): 2 genera, 2 species
 Family Phocoenidae (porpoises): 3 genera, 8 species
 Family Physeteridae (sperm whale): 1 genus, 1 species
 Family Platanistidae (South Asian river dolphins): 1 genus, 2 species
 Family Pontoporiidae (brackish river dolphins): 1 genus, 1 species
 Family Ziphiidae (beaked whales)
 Subfamily Berardiinae (four-toothed whales): 1 genus, 3 species
 Subfamily Hyperoodontinae (bottlenose whales and mesoplodont whales): 3 genera, 18 species
 Subfamily Ziphiinae (Cuvier's beaked whale and Shepherd's beaked whale): 2 genera, 2 species
 Family Hippopotamidae (hippopotamuses): 2 genera, 2 species

Artiodactyls
The following classification is based on the taxonomy described by Mammal Species of the World (2005), with augmentation by generally accepted proposals made since using molecular phylogenetic analysis.

Suborder Ruminantia

Infraorder Pecora

Family Antilocapridae
Members of the Antilocapridae family are called antilocaprids; the family is composed of a single extant species, the pronghorn.

Family Bovidae

Members of the Bovidae family are bovids and include sheep, cattle, goats, antelope, gazelles, and others. Bovidae comprises 144 extant species, divided into 52 genera. These genera are grouped into eight subfamilies: Aepycerotinae, or the impala; Alcelaphinae, containing the bontebok, hartebeest, wildebeest, and relatives; Antilopinae, containing several antelope, gazelles, and relatives; Bovinae, containing cattle, buffalos, bison, and other antelopes; Caprinae, containing goats, sheep, ibex, serows and relatives; Cephalophinae, or duikers; Hippotraginae, containing the addax, oryx, and relatives; and Reduncinae, or reedbuck and kob antelopes.

Family Cervidae

Members of the Cervidae family are cervids, or colloquially deer. Cervidae comprises 53 extant species, divided into 19 genera. These genera are grouped into two subfamilies: Capreolinae, or New World deer, and Cervinae, or Old World deer.

Family Giraffidae

Members of the Giraffidae family are giraffids, and are the giraffes and the okapi. Giraffidae comprises five extant species in two genera.

Family Moschidae

Members of the Moschidae family are moschids, or colloquially musk deer. Moschidae contains seven extant species in a single genus.

Family Tragulidae

Members of the Tragulidae family are tragulids, or colloquially chevrotains or mouse-deer. Tragulidae contains 10 extant species in 3 genera.

Suborder Suina

Family Suidae
Members of the Suidae family are suids, or colloquially pigs, hogs, or boars. Suidae comprises 17 extant species, divided into 6 genera, and is not split into subfamilies.

Family Tayassuidae
Members of the Tayassuidae family are tayassuids, or colloquially peccaries. Tayassuidae comprises 3 extant species in 3 genera, and is not split into subfamilies.

Suborder Tylopoda

Family Camelidae

Members of the Camelidae family are camelids, and include camels, llamas, and alpacas. Camelidae contains 7 extant species in 2 genera.

Suborder Whippomorpha

Infraorder Cetacea

Parvorder Mysticeti

Family Balaenidae

Members of the Balaenidae family are balaenids, or colloquially right whales. Balaenidae contains four species in two genera.

Family Balaenopteridae

Members of the Balaenopteridae family are balaenopterids, or colloquially rorquals. Balaenopteridae contains eleven species in three genera.

Family Cetotheriidae

Members of the Cetotheriidae family are cetotheriids; the only extant species is the pygmy right whale.

Parvorder Odontoceti

Family Delphinidae

Members of the Delphinidae family are delphinids, or colloquially oceanic dolphins. Delphinidae contains 37 species in 19 genera, which are grouped into four named subfamilies: Delphininae, Lissodelphininae, Globicephalinae, and Orcininae, as well as one unnamed group.

Family Iniidae

Members of the Iniidae family are inniids, and are part of a grouping colloqially termed river dolphins along with Lipotidae, Platanistidae and Pontoporiidae. Iniidae contains four species in one genus.

Family Kogiidae

Members of the Kogiidae family are kogiids, and are part of the sperm whale superfamily Physeteroidea; the family contains two species in one genus.

Family Lipotidae

Members of the Lipotidae family are lipotids and are part of the river dolphin grouping along with Iniidae, Platanistidae and Pontoporiidae; the only extant species is the baiji.

Family Monodontidae

Members of the Monodontidae family are monodontids and comprises two living whale species in two genera, the narwhal and the beluga whale.

Family Phocoenidae

Members of the Phocoenidae family are phocoenids, or colloquially porpoises. Phocoenidae contains eight species in three genera.

Family Physeteridae

Members of the Physeteridae family are physeterids, and are part of the sperm whale superfamily Physeteroidea; the only extant species is the sperm whale.

Family Platanistidae

Members of the Platanistidae family are platanistids, and are part of a grouping colloqially termed river dolphins along with Iniidae, Lipotidae, and Pontoporiidae. Platanistidae contains two species in one genus.

Family Pontoporiidae

Members of the Pontoporiidae family are pontoporiids, and are part of a grouping colloqially termed river dolphins along with Iniidae, Lipotidae, and Platanistidae. The only extant species is the La Plata dolphin.

Family Ziphiidae

Members of the Ziphiidae family are ziphiids, or colloquially beaked whales. Ziphiidae contains 23 species in 6 genera, which are grouped into three named subfamilies: Berardiinae, Hyperoodontinae, and Ziphiinae.

Family Hippopotamidae

Members of the Hippopotamidae family are hippopotamids, or colloquially hippopotamuses or hippos. Hippopotamidae contains 2 species in 2 genera.

See also 
 Mammal classification

References
{{reflist|refs=

<ref name="Eudorcas">Eudorcas habitats and diets:
 Mongalla gazelle:

Sources

 
 
 
 
 
 
 
 
 
 
 
 
 
 
 
 
 
 
 
 
 
 
 
 
 

 
Artiodactyla
Artiodactyla